Isri is a census town in the Dumri CD block in Dumri sub-division of Giridih district in the Indian state of Jharkhand.

Overview
Isri Bazar is the main market of the block and is situated on NH 19 (old NH 2)/ Grand Trunk Road. The railway station is called Parasnath on the Grand Chord. Parasnath Hill is well known for Jain temples. Parasnath is a major destination for Jain pilgrims.

Geography

Location

Area overview
Giridih district is a part of the Chota Nagpur plateau, with rocky soil and extensive forests. Most of the rivers in the district flow from the west to east, except in the northern portion where the rivers flow north and north west. The district has coal and mica mines. It is an overwhelmingly rural district with small pockets of urbanisation.

Note: The map alongside presents some of the notable locations in the district. All places marked in the map are linked in the larger full screen map.

Demographics
According to the 2011 Census of India, Isri had a total population of 9,749, of which 5,088 (52%) were males and 4,661 (48%) were females. Population in the age range 0–6 years was 1,420. The total number of literate persons in Isri was 6,872 (82.51% of the population over 6 years).

 India census, Isri had a population of 8,796.  Males constitute 53% of the population and females 47%.  Isri has an average literacy rate of 66%, higher than the national average of 59.5%: male literacy is 74%, and female literacy is 57%. In Isri, 15% of the population is under 6 years of age.

Infrastructure
According to the District Census Handbook 2011, Giridih, Isri covered an area of 3.24 km2. Among the civic amenities, it had 6 km roads with open drains, the protected water supply involved uncovered well, hand pump. It had 1,604 domestic electric connections, 15 road lighting points. Among the educational facilities it had 8 primary schools, 2 middle schools, 2 secondary schools. Among the social, recreational and cultural facilities it had 1 auditorium/ community hall. Two important commodities it produced were mustard oil, ghee. It had the branch offices of 3 nationalised banks, 1 private commercial bank, 2 cooperative banks, 1 agricultural credit society.

Education
Parashnath Mahavidyalaya was established at Isri Bazar in 1985. Affiliated to Vinoba Bhave University it offers bachelor's courses in arts, science and commerce.
Jharkhand College, Dumri, 
PCDAV Public School, Hethnagar 
D.A.V. Central School, ISO 9001:2008,
Central Academy, 
P N D Jain High School - Isri Bazar,
St.Paul's High School - Aoura, Bagodar. Hafiz Ansari, Founder and Chairman of St. PHS. It was established on 27 July 2007.
S.S.K.B. High School - Isri Bazar,
Bhagat school -Isri Bazar,
P N D Jain Middle School -Isri Bazar,
Tara Modern Public School

Honey Dew Public School- Dr. Sujit Mathur
Progressive public school -Dumri

Festivals
A number of festivals are celebrated including the following:
Diwali
Duragapuja
Holi
Eid
Bakrid
Muharram
Shivratri
Krishna janmastami
Eid miladun-nabi
Mahavir jayanti
Chhath puja
Karma
Ramnavmi Puja

References

External links

Cities and towns in Giridih district